Nashwaak or Nashwaaksis may refer to:

Nashwaak Bridge, New Brunswick, a settlement
Nashwaak River, a tributary of the Saint John River
Nashwaak Village, New Brunswick, a settlement located in York County
Nashwaak, New Brunswick
Nashwaak Lake (New Brunswick), lake in New Brunswick
Nashwaaksis, New Brunswick, a neighbourhood and former village in the city of Fredericton
Fredericton-Nashwaaksis, a provincial electoral district for the Legislative Assembly of New Brunswick, Canada

See also
Nashwauk, Minnesota, a city in Itasca County